Patrick Robinson (born 12 November 1943) is a Jamaican sprinter. He competed in the men's 4 × 100 metres relay at the 1964 Summer Olympics.

References

1943 births
Living people
Athletes (track and field) at the 1964 Summer Olympics
Jamaican male sprinters
Olympic athletes of Jamaica
Place of birth missing (living people)
Central American and Caribbean Games medalists in athletics